Nagaram is a formally known as Naagavaram Suburb of Hyderabad and a municipality in Telangana, India. 
And it also the largest Revenue Village falls under Keesara mandal of Medchal-Malkajgiri district. Due to its proximity to ECIL Company, Secunderabad and Eastern IT/SEZ of Hyderabad Pocharam, it is emerging as a major residential location in Hyderabad. 

The nearest localities to Nagaram is Ahmadguda , Dammaiguda and Kushaiguda. 

Till 2013 this area was dotted with green paddy fields everywhere. This has changed a lot due to the demand for residential apartments and commercial establishments all across Rampally main road. The demand for residential houses has increased because of various reasons like the proximity to Outer Ring Road, declaration of Nagaram municipality and due to abundant options for public transport.

Nagaram Municipality

Nagaram Municipality was constituted vide Go Ms No: 93 of MA & UD Dept
Dated :18-04-2018, duly merging existing Gram Panchayats of Nagaram & Rampally Villages . The Municipality Administration is functioning w.e.f on Dt : 02-08-2018.

Nagaram Munilcipality was Establilshed on 20-04-2019. Which is located very near to Hyderabad (Capital of Telangana). And is Highly Facilitated by all means of transportations and very adjacent to ORR.
Municipality Specialities: Very Comfortable area for Living, Education, Hospitality and having a scope of new resources of Employment in all stages.
Nagaram Municipality consisting of 103 colonies Approximately total population of above 64542 including rampally village which is merged into Nagaram Municipality.

Till 2013 this area was dotted with green paddy fields everywhere. This has changed a lot due to the demand for residential apartments and commercial establishments all across Rampally main road. The demand for residential houses has increased because of various reasons like the proximity to Outer Ring Road, declaration of Nagaram municipality and due to abundant options for public transport. Nagaram is situated about 481 metres (1,578 ft) above sea level. There are 3 lakes Nagaram Annarayana Cheruvu, Nagaram Cheruvu, Rampally Cheruvu, in the vicinity of the area. This is one of the reasons the area is witnessing major development in terms of commercial establishments all across the main road.

Nagaram Revenue Village 
Easterwile Nagaram Village has it hamlet villages Dammaigudem, Ahmedgudem Bandlaguda Village,, Now They are bifurcated as Separate Revenue Villages.
Localities of Nagaram Village.
 Naagavaram Old Village
 Simhapuri Colony
 Silpa nagar,
 Satyanarayanapuram,
 East & West Gandhi nagar,
 RL nagar,
 RTC Colony,
 SV Colony,
 Reddy Colony,
 Rampally X Roads,(Nagaram) formally Ghatkesar Way X Road,
 Dammaiguda Way X Roads (Nagaram X Road).
 Ipws colony(Indra priyadarshini welfare society)

Geography
There are 2 lakes in the vicinity of the area.

Transport
The Area is well connected by TSRTC to the rest of the city, having bus depot at Kushaiguda. Nearest Railway station is Cherlapally at about 5 km and Moula Ali at about 10 km, The other nearest Major Railway Junction  is Secunderabad at about 17.1 km. There is a proposal to upgrade Cherlapally Railway Station,[3] as a Major Terminus to decongest traffic in Secunderabad Railway Station. Nearest exit and entry junction for Nehru Outer Ring Road is at Keesara Junction. The ECIL to Keesaragutta road passes through Nagaram. There is also a connecting route to the Karimnagar highway that passes through Nagaram and takes diversion from Cheriyal to Shamirpet which is mostly used nowadays in order to avoid traffic in the Karimnagar highway at Alwal – Bolarum corridor of Secunderabad Cantonment. One can also reach the Warangal highway by taking a diversion towards Rampally X roads through Ghatkesar. This is one of the reasons the area is witnessing major development in terms of commercial establishments all across the main road.

Economy
The presence of various retail outlets have led to hike in commercial rents in the recent past. D Mart, Reliance Digital, Usodaya super market, More super market, Vishal Mega mart and Showrooms of Royal Enfield Royaloak, and various other service centers have come up are located in within Nagaram's vicinity. Close to 20 furniture outlets have come up in this area.

References 

Villages in Medchal–Malkajgiri district

Neighbourhoods in Hyderabad, India

Tourism and Temples 
The Famous and well known Sri Ramalingeshwara Swami Temlple is located at Keesara gutta near by Nagaram Municipality within 10 km of radius.